Cherwell Valley services is a motorway service station on the M40 motorway at Stoke Lyne, near Bicester, in Oxfordshire, England. In August 2011 it was rated as 3 stars by quality assessors at Visit England; however, it is unknown whether this was a rating of the new or temporary building.

Location
The services are located at junction 10 of the M40, and are accessed from a roundabout on the junction.

Despite its name, it is neither in the valley nor the drainage basin of the Cherwell, but rather beside a small east-flowing stream that becomes part of the Padbury Brook before joining the Great Ouse at Buckingham.

History

It was opened in the spring of 1994 and gave the 89-mile motorway its first service station, more than three years after its completion. The site was previously occupied by a toilet facility, which had been there since the motorway's opening.

Three more service stations have since been added on the M40: 
Warwick
Oxford
Beaconsfield

A Travelodge has existed at the service station since its opening.

2010 fire
On 15 April 2010, the main building was destroyed by fire. The main site was to be rebuilt to a similar style to Wetherby services on the A1(M).
Construction on the new building started on 27 June 2010 and was completed for reopening on 30 June 2011.

References

External links 
Moto official site — Cherwell Valley
Motorway Services Online — Cherwell Valley
Motorway Services Info — Cherwell Valley

Transport infrastructure completed in 1994
M40 motorway service stations
Moto motorway service stations
Buildings and structures in Oxfordshire
Transport in Oxfordshire